Synemon parthenoides, the orange-spotted sunmoth or link moth, is a moth in the Castniidae family. It is found in Australia, including Victoria, Western Australia and South Australia.

The wingspan is about 35 mm for males and 44 mm for females. The upperside of the forewings is blackish-grey, with small black and white markings that are more pronounced in the females. The undersides of the forewings are boldly patterned in black and orange and have a few obscure whitish markings toward their apices. The upperside of the hindwings is black with bright orange spots and markings. The hindwing undersides are similar except that there are also a few indistinct whitish markings near their apices.

The larvae feed on the tussocks of Lepidosperma carphoides. They are pale pink.

References

Moths described in 1874
Castniidae